The 1965 UK & Ireland Greyhound Racing Year was the 39th year of greyhound racing in the United Kingdom and Ireland.

Roll of honour

Summary
The industry experienced a small rise in attendances and totalisator turnover for the first time since 1946. The National Greyhound Racing Club (NGRC) affiliated tracks saw 11,213,730 paying customers at 5972 meetings with tote turnover of £58,480,219. However the possibility of future increases was unlikely because there was competition from television, which had found its way into many of Britain's households, bingo halls (a recent gambling rival) which was now established and dance halls pulled in the younger generation. In addition many companies that owned tracks had evaluated that selling them for redevelopment brought large short term financial gain, especially in major cities.

Tracks
Staines Greyhound Stadium was demolished, five years after closing and the Mexborough greyhound track called the Dog Daisy Stadium, which was situated on the corner of Sedgefield Way and Harlington Road also shut. Seaforth Greyhound Stadium closed on 31 December. Romford Stadium Ltd sold their controlling interest in the Dagenham Greyhound Stadium track for £185,000 stating that government restrictions on fixtures forced both tracks to race on the same day which impacted attendances. Incidentally The Dagenham Coup court case continued.

News
On 25 January Juvenile champion Hi Joe trained by Noreen Collin and owned by bookmaker Victor Chandler Sr. was stolen from his Epping kennels. Initial hopes were that he could be recovered quickly to allow him to line up for the English Greyhound Derby but as the weeks passed he had not been recovered.

John Sutton became the Managing Director of the Greyhound Racing Association and the GRA extended its board by adding Major Percy Brown, John Cearns (son of WJ Cearns) and Charles Chandler Jr. to the directors. They then sold the Kingsfurze breeding establishment at Naas in County Kildare, the seven acre grounds had been breeding greyhounds for over 17 years. This was followed by the sale of Upper Childown Farm and Fan Court Farm grounds in Longcross near Chertsey. The two properties were used as a nursery and rearing establishment by the GRA. Further cutbacks by the GRA included the sacking of two advertising executives and five trainers from the Hook Estate and Kennels. Harry Buck, Dick Clark, Albert Jonas, Eric Hiscock and Jack Cooper all left while the remaining ten Hook Kennels trainers would cover the three tracks of White City Greyhounds, Harringay Stadium and Stamford Bridge Greyhounds. The Chairman and Directors were rewarded for their work by gaining a significant rise, doubling their salaries, which was deferred until 1966.

Track Chromatography (a drug testing unit) was first used at Walthamstow in their purpose built lab. Leading owner, the 70 year old shipping magnate Noel Purvis retired after forty years owning greyhounds, he rated Mile Bush Pride as his greatest greyhound.

Ireland
Des Hanrahan became Chairman of the Bord na gCon and actively sought to buy any Irish tracks in danger of being sold to developers.

At the seaside resort of Ballybunion in County Kerry, Matt Sullivan finally received a licence to open Ballybunion Greyhound Stadium despite having to go to court against the Bord na gCon, who had reservations that it was too close to the Kingdom Greyhound Stadium in Tralee.

A litter whelped in February 1965, at the kennels of Leo Stack at Duagh, Co. Kerry, would become one of the greatest litters in the history of track racing. The litter, of five dogs and four bitches, was by Crazy Parachute out of Supreme Witch and included Forward Flash (a black dog), Forward King (a fawn dog), Spectre II and Tric-Trac (two black dogs) and Gezira (a fawn bitch).

Competitions
The Grand Prix at Walthamstow Stadium is cancelled for the second year in succession due to problems over filling the event. Walthamstow had applied for a change to 700 yards at late notice but it is refused by the NGRC. They will however apply for a longer distance the following year and be successful. Conna Count, a white and brindle dog became the fourth greyhound to successfully defend the Laurels at Wimbledon Stadium for a new increased prize of £1,500.

Clonmannon Flash, the Jim Hookway trained greyhound won the Scottish Greyhound Derby, Northern Flat, Edinburgh Cup, Pall Mall Stakes, Gimcrack and Stewards' Cup. He subsequently received the accolade of Greyhound of the Year at the end of year awards held at the Dorchester Hotel.

Principal UK races

Totalisator returns

The totalisator returns declared to the licensing authorities for the year 1965 are listed below.

References 

Greyhound racing in the United Kingdom
Greyhound racing in the Republic of Ireland
UK and Ireland Greyhound Racing Year
UK and Ireland Greyhound Racing Year
UK and Ireland Greyhound Racing Year
UK and Ireland Greyhound Racing Year